The SNCF Class BB 325 was a class of 25 electric locomotives built between 1946 and 1948.  The class was a development of the pre-war Midi Class E4700 and very similar to the Class BB 300. As delivered they were numbered 0325–0355. Under the 1950 renumbering scheme they became BB 325–BB 355.

In 1967 the cab end doors were removed. The class was withdrawn in 1997.

Preservation

3 members of the class have been preserved:
 BB 327 at Site du Train, Nîmes
 BB 346 at Site du Train, Nîmes
 BB 348 at Mohon, an annexe of Cité du train, Mulhouse.

References

325
B-B locomotives
BB 325
Standard gauge locomotives of France

Passenger locomotives